The Otis-Wyman House is a historic house at 67 Thurston Street in Somerville, Massachusetts. This -story wood-frame house, built c. 1883, is a well-preserved example of Queen Anne styling.  It has projecting gable sections, bays, and porches typical of the style, as well as decorative trim elements such as bargeboard, bracketed eaves, and gabled window hoods.  It was originally owned by William R. Otis, a cabinetmaker, and later the residence of Charles B. Wyman, a restaurant owner.

The house was listed on the National Register of Historic Places in 1989.

See also
National Register of Historic Places listings in Somerville, Massachusetts

References

Houses completed in 1883
Houses on the National Register of Historic Places in Somerville, Massachusetts